Frederick George Hall-Jones  (4 July 1891 – 28 January 1982) was a New Zealand lawyer, historian and community leader.

Biography
Hall-Jones was born in Scarborough just south of Timaru, South Canterbury, New Zealand, on 4 July 1891, the son of William Hall-Jones and Rosalind Lucy Hall-Jones (née Purss).

He took over the legal practice of R. H. Rattray at Invercargill in 1917, it later being known as Hall-Jones & Sons.

Hall-Jones was appointed an Officer of the Order of the British Empire in the 1957 Queen's Birthday Honours, for services in community affairs and as an historian in Southland. His son, John Hall-Jones, was an otolaryngologist (i.e. a doctor who specialised in the ear, nose, and throat or ENT region), author and historian of southern New Zealand.

Selected works

References

1891 births
1982 deaths
Invercargill City Councillors
20th-century New Zealand lawyers
20th-century New Zealand historians
People from South Canterbury
New Zealand Officers of the Order of the British Empire
Unsuccessful candidates in the 1938 New Zealand general election
Children of prime ministers of New Zealand
New Zealand National Party politicians
Burials at St John's Cemetery, Invercargill